Harju JK Laagri, commonly known as Harju JK, or simply as Harju, is an Estonian football club based in Laagri, Harjumaa. Founded in 2009, the club has gained promotion four years in a row and from the 2023 season, competes in the Meistriliiga, the top flight of Estonian football.

History
Harju Jalgpallikool was founded on 27 August 2009 with the aim of focusing on youth football and developing players for Estonian national teams and foreign academies. Harju JK entered senior football in 2015, when their first team entered IV Liiga, the lowest level of football in Estonia.

In 2019, Harju JK appointed Portuguese Victor da Silva as their manager and in the following seasons gained promotion four years in a row. During the period, Harju's team consisted mostly of their youth system players, which resulted in youth prospects Karel Mustmaa signing a three-year professional contract with Benfica and Imre Kartau moving to Venezia F.C.. Harju JK won Esiliiga in the 2022 season and were promoted to Estonian top flight league Premium Liiga for the first time in its history.

Players
 As of 3 March 2023For season transfers, see transfers winter 2022–23.''

Personnel

Current technical staff

Managerial history

Honours

League 

 Esiliiga
Winners (1): 2022

Statistics

League and Cup

References

Football clubs in Estonia
Association football clubs established in 2009
2009 establishments in Estonia
Meistriliiga clubs